The Birmingham and Aston Tramways Company operated a steam-powered tramway service in Birmingham and Aston between 1882 and 1902.

History

The Birmingham and Aston Tramways Order of 1880 approved the construction of the first steam tramway in Birmingham which duly opened on 26 December 1882.

It ran from Aston Street in the centre of Birmingham via Aston Cross and then followed two routes to Witton, one via Park Road and Witton Lane and the other along Lichfield Road and Church Lane.

On 23 February 1885 a branch line to the foot of Gravelly Hill from Lichfield Road was opened.

Fleet

The rolling stock comprised steam locomotive engines in a crimson livery and Starbuck Car and Wagon Company double-deck trailer cars in cream. The locomotive fleet comprised acquisitions as follows:
1 Kitson and Company 1882
2-6 Kitson and Company 1883
7-8 Wilkinson 1883
9-12 Kitson and Company 1883
13-16 Kitson and Company 1885
17-27 Kitson and Company 1886

Parameters 
 Gauge: 
 Voltage:

Closure

Aston Manor Urban District Council purchased the part of the tramway within their boundary on 30 June 1902 with the remaining section going to Birmingham Corporation on 1 January 1904. Aston Manor Urban District Council leased it back to the City of Birmingham Tramways Company.

References

Tram transport in England
3 ft 6 in gauge railways in England
Transport in Birmingham, West Midlands